Mackenzie Fierceton (born Mackenzie Terrell on August 9, 1997; later Mackenzie Morrison,) is an American activist and graduate student currently studying at Oxford University. Raised in Chesterfield, Missouri, a West County suburb of St. Louis, she attended and graduated from the Whitfield School in Creve Coeur. She received a bachelor's degree in political science and a master's degree in social work from the University of Pennsylvania through a combined five-year program.

Fierceton documented the physical and psychological abuse her mother subjected her to during her high school years. She lived with her mother since her parents divorce and a guardian ad litem was appointed to represent Fierceton's interests in the proceedings surrounding the abuse allegations. Fellow students, student's, and Whitfield faculty noticed the signs that led them to suspect Fierceton's abuse. She was hospitalized twice in 2014 due to injuries she says were inflicted by her mother. After the second stay, which lasted three weeks, state officials placed her in foster care and arrested her mother under child abuse charges, which were later dropped. Connecticut state courts later expunged the arrest and removed her mother from the state's child-abuser registry. Supporters of Fierceton's mother called Mackenzie an emotionally manipulative girl who would injure herself and fabricate abuse indicators to be an appealing candidate for admission to an Ivy League college such as the University of Pennsylvania.

Fierceton finished her Whitfield education on a scholarship while living in foster homes. She was then admitted to Penn on a full scholarship where she identified as a first-generation low-income (FGLI) student despite her background of parental estrangement and lack of financial support. Upon receiving a Rhodes Scholarship, questions arose about Fierceton's background and if it was accurately represented. An investigation by both the Rhodes Trust and Penn concluded she failed to correct statements and impressions made in her application essays. She withdrew from the Rhodes Scholarship and a sympathetic Penn faculty member paid her Oxford tuition.

Penn's Office of Student Conduct recommended withholding her master's degree until past fines were paid. The conditions for awarding her masters were dropped, but a notation about the investigative finding remains in her transcript. Fierceton is suing Penn for defamation, alleging their investigation was done to discredit her as a witness in a wrongful death suit filed against the university by the widow of a fellow student which Fierceton instigated. Her supporters at Penn have called for the university's acting provost, Beth Winkelstein, to be held accountable for her role in the investigation, characterizing it as a continuation of her abuse. In early 2022, her struggle with Penn and the Rhodes Trust gained national attention through stories run in The Chronicle of Higher Education and The New Yorker. Commentators took the university and American elite higher education to task for its use of Fierceton and other recent Rhodes recipients as poverty porn and its shifting definition of an FGLI student.

Early life

Fierceton was born August 9, 1997, under the name Mackenzie Terrell, in Danbury, Connecticut, to Carrie Morrison, a physician who would later head the breast imaging department at St. Luke's Hospital in Chesterfield, where the couple lived. Her father, Billy Terrell, had been an actor in soap operas.

In the early 2000s the couple went through a protracted divorce during which a guardian ad litem was appointed to represent their daughter's interests at the custody hearing. The court granted Morrison a protection order against her former husband; Fierceton had no relationship with him from that time onward. Afterwards Morrison changed her daughter's last name to her own.

Morrison prospered in her medical career, and she provided generously for her daughter, allowing her to ride horses, go on river rafting trips and attend exclusive private schools, such as Whitfield, in nearby Creve Coeur, where annual tuition was almost $30,000. In high school there, Fierceton was a model student. She got straight A's, served in student government, managed the field hockey team, played varsity soccer, and volunteered to assist with the local Special Olympics.

Allegations of abuse by mother

Teachers noticed that Fierceton often seemed physically uncomfortable in her mother's presence, and a close friend noted that she was often injured. Asked by the school's wellness director (who later told police she had seen insulting texts from Morrison on Fierceton's phone) about the reasons for the injuries, Fierceton said that she was "clumsy" but did not offer any details.

During her high school years, Fierceton has alleged that her mother subjected her to emotional and physical abuse, the latter enough on more than one occasion to require hospitalization. One trigger for the beatings was sexual abuse by one of her mother's boyfriends, Henry Lovelace, Jr., a fitness trainer and multiple winner of the Missouri's Strongest Man competition in his weight class, which her mother warned her never to talk about.

At the end of 2013, in the middle of her sophomore year, Fierceton was admitted to St. Luke's, where her mother worked, with a head injury. She did not remember what had caused it. Morrison had told the admitting physician that she had not been present when her daughter was hurt but believed she had fallen down the stairs in the house, which the hospital accepted as the likely cause, even though her fearfulness was also noted. Fierceton was released after four days.

In March 2014, Fierceton began keeping a secret diary  documenting her life and her ruminations on her situation, writing it in her bedroom closet by the light of her phone and hiding it behind a ventilation panel. She had begun to remember more about the incident, and while still not certain how it had happened recalled that before it she and her mother had been fighting about Lovelace. She feared that her mother had inflicted the injuries, perhaps out of jealousy that Lovelace was attracted to her, even as it seemed to Fierceton that Morrison was "offering [her] up to him on a silver platter".

"Family is not the people you are related to by blood," she wrote in the diary. "They are the people that support you, look out for you, & love you unconditionally. By those standards, the standards of real family, not one person I'm related to by blood meets those requirements or even comes close." She considered the advantages and disadvantages of reporting her mother, but ultimately feared she might not even be believed, as her mother would tell people she was mentally ill or lying. "She lies better than I can tell the truth." She considered running away but had a distant relationship with her father, and nowhere else she believed she could go.

At the beginning of April, after she came to school with a black eye that showed through the concealer she put over it, she was taken to see the wellness director, who asked what had happened. Fierceton told the story that, according to her diary, her mother had told her to tell—that she had tripped while playing with the family dogs and bruised herself on the corner of a nearby table. The wellness director told her she would have to notify the state's Department of Social Services (DSS) of the incident. In the presence of her mother that night at their house, Mackenzie repeated the same story to a visiting caseworker, who appeared to accept it. But afterwards she was anxious enough about how her mother might react to remain on the other side of the kitchen counter island from Morrison while they talked in the kitchen, "bracing for impact", she wrote in her diary.

At the beginning of the next school year, Fierceton was examined by her pediatrician, who noticed a large bruise on her arm but chose not to X-ray it, a decision the doctor later regretted. At school, she began confiding about her situation with a history teacher, telling them about her mother's physical abuse. The recurring sexual abuse by Lovelace had made Fierceton even more anxious over the summer after he gave her mother a gun as a gift (Morrison had called the police after Lovelace showed Fierceton pictures of the gun. Two other women he was involved with had also reported him to law enforcement).

Hospitalization and mother's arrest

One day in September 2014, she told the history teacher about Lovelace's abuse. They reported it to the state's child-abuse hotline. That night at home, Morrison, who had apparently learned of the report, confronted her daughter about it. According to Fierceton, her mother pushed her down the stairs and then beat her extensively at the bottom.
  
The next morning, when Fierceton awoke, Morrison told her she was taking her car keys and telling the school she was sick. After her mother left, Fierceton got out of bed, found a spare set of keys and drove herself to school. There, she wandered the hallways until she found the history teacher, and collapsed. The teacher recalled that she had black eyes and hair matted with blood, a description corroborated by a nurse who saw her on arrival after an ambulance brought her to nearby Mercy Hospital St. Louis. The nurse also reported bruises all over Fierceton's body, in different stages of healing, considered an indicator of possible physical abuse.

Local police were called. Detective Carrie Brandt, who had been planning to follow up on the hotline report at Whitfield that day, instead interviewed Fierceton at the hospital. She told Brandt it was her mother, and asked her to keep Morrison from coming to her room. A picture of her was posted at the nurse's station should she make the attempt.

Brandt interviewed Morrison, who described herself and her daughter as "two peas in a pod". At first she explained Fierceton's injuries as either having been caused by an intruder or somehow self-inflicted, then said her daughter had fallen downstairs while she was trying to help her get some chewing gum out of her hair. Asked about Lovelace's alleged sexual abuse, specifically an incident the year before where Fierceton, having fallen asleep in her mother's bed, woke to find him caressing her breasts, Morrison expressed amusement at the possibility that her boyfriend could have mistaken her teenage daughter for her; Lovelace, interviewed separately, denied all the allegations.

Brandt noted that Morrison never asked about, or expressed concern for, her daughter's well-being. She found Fierceton's diary at the house and read it, then interviewed teachers and administrators at Whitfield, learning of Morrison's insulting texts to Fierceton. A week later, Brandt interviewed Morrison again at the police station; this time she said that her daughter had injured herself, saying "I guess she has more problems than I thought." Morrison was arrested and charged with felony child abuse and third-degree assault (a misdemeanor) in the incident that had led to Fierceton's hospitalization, and an additional felony child abuse count for the incident that had triggered the DSS caseworker's visit earlier in the year; the arrest warrant alleged that Morrison had deliberately slammed her daughter's head into the table. Lovelace was also arrested and charged with sexual abuse.

Fierceton remained in the hospital, where DSS ordered her placed in protective custody. She kept a journal, writing that she was in so much pain from her bruised ribs that she could barely breathe. Chewing was difficult as well, and she had a feeding tube inserted. She was diagnosed with post-concussion syndrome and released after three weeks. DSS had originally planned to place Fierceton with one of her mother's sisters but put her in foster care after Whitfield's principal warned the agency that Fierceton would not be safe with them. The court had ordered Fierceton and Morrison into family therapy, but the former was too afraid of the latter to do it.

Morrison's arrest had been reported in the St. Louis Post-Dispatch, where commenters on the online version of the story took her side, speculating that Fierceton was "an entitled brat" who had vengefully fabricated charges that had the potential to end her mother's medical career. Morrison's bond was originally set at $40,000, but lowered to $5,000 over prosecutors' strenuous objections. She posted it before Fierceton's release from the hospital, and once free began calling Fierceton's friends and former teachers, telling them that Fierceton was having issues and had made it appear Morrison had beaten her. A former teacher in elementary school recalled that in one of those calls, Morrison made a reference to an earlier discussion of Fierceton's mental illness; the teacher did not remember any such conversation.

Morrison retained William Margulis, a former member of Whitfield's board who had sent four of his children there, including one of her daughter's classmates, as her attorney. This made Fierceton feel as if she were being watched for anything she did that could be used against the state's case by her mother. She felt as if it might have been an attempt to intimidate her. Margulis later told The New Yorker that he had been telling the prosecutor repeatedly that Fierceton "had no credibility and made all of this up", the same theme as Morrison's many arguments in person and over the phone to other Whitfield parents.

Some of those Morrison talked with did believe her; a classmate of Fierceton's recalled people likening her to the protagonist of the film Gone Girl, about a Missouri woman who disappears in order to avenge herself on an adulterous husband, whom she makes it appear killed her. The mother of a friend of Fierceton's recalls that when she told Morrison on the phone that she "was not interested" in hearing what Morrison had to say, she got angry and confrontational. Later, another Whitfield parent Morrison had talked to told this woman that she believed Fierceton had done this to get admitted to an Ivy League college, an idea which she found preposterous.

Foster care placement

Fierceton moved into the first of several foster homes, with one other foster sibling and two biological children of the foster parents. Teachers and parents at Whitfield had donated new clothing and school supplies for her. She recalled showing up at the foster home with her new clothes in a plastic bag, feeling "like a passenger in my own body", she recalled later.

Later that year, after that first foster home turned out to be "chaotic", with Fierceton's foster sibling attempting suicide, she moved to another one. By the end of the year she was in a third foster home. In between those placements, she slept at friends' houses for long periods.

For her senior year, Whitfield gave Fierceton a full scholarship. When she turned 18, she formally left foster care but continued living with the family whose home she was in. The change in her living situation greatly complicated her college plans as she had no financial resources of her own. A college counselor suggested she apply through QuestBridge, a nonprofit that helps qualified students in need find schools that will give them full financial support.

Fierceton was accepted at the University of Pennsylvania (commonly known as Penn) on a full scholarship, arranged through QuestBridge. Again following the advice of her college counselor, she did not identify her parents on her application, since she was estranged from both of them (she describes them both as "biological"). Penn's admissions department thus automatically coded Fierceton as a first-generation student, a category it was seeking to increase among its undergraduate population, even though her mother had an advanced degree and her grandfather was a college graduate who had taught at the University of Missouri.

Dismissal of mother's charges and expurgation of records

In February 2015, before presenting the evidence against Morrison to a grand jury for an indictment, the St. Louis County district attorney's office dropped all the charges against Morrison over Brandt's objections. It did not disclose that it had done so until March. The charges against Lovelace were dropped later for lack of evidence.

A spokesman for the D.A.'s office explained the decision to drop the charges against Morrison as based on new evidence that had emerged. Brandt, the Chesterfield police detective who had originally investigated the case, said later that the prosecutor never explained to her what that new evidence was. "I advised him that this was ridiculous, and this had to be a 'status thing", she said.

Morrison, no longer employed by St. Luke's, then began the process of trying to restore her reputation by having all references to it removed from the public record. A petition to the county circuit court to have the arrest expunged was granted in a one-page order that attributed the arrest to "false information". Within a year of her arrest, another St. Louis-area hospital had granted her admitting privileges, and she was able to resume her medical career.

DSS kept Morrison on its child-abuser registry, as it still believed the allegations to be founded, and a petition to its Child Abuse and Neglect Review Board to have her removed was denied. Morrison then brought suit in circuit court to have the board's decision reviewed and reversed. A trial was held in early 2019 at which she, Fierceton, a psychologist and a DSS investigator testified. Mother and daughter both told the same stories they had earlier; Morrison depicted her daughter as "willful and intense", claiming she had bought and read many books to try to help her understand the issues she said Fierceton had.

Morrison's lawyer questioned Fierceton closely about apparent differences between her medical records from the hospital and her description of her injuries in a scholarship application essay the lawyer had obtained, and other details from the latter, such as the "metallic" taste of a feeding tube that was plastic and her claim that she was unable to recognize her own facial features in the hospital mirror, when her medical records showed that her injuries were well short of being even temporarily disfiguring. The psychologist testified that she had seen both mother and daughter during 2007 and 2008. She had seen no signs of abuse in the relationship and considered Fierceton to be the dominant personality in it.

Judge Kristine Allen Kerr ultimately held for Morrison. "While it is possible that [she] was the cause of the alleged injuries," she wrote a month afterward, "the court cannot make that finding by a preponderance of the evidence based on the evidence presented." While Kerr noted that Fierceton's three weeks in the hospital was far longer than might be expected given the bruises that led to her admission, she also noted the absence of injuries to Fierceton's back despite having reportedly fallen or being thrown downstairs. Morrison's name was therefore ordered removed from the DSS registry.

College career

Fierceton had initially expected it would be easier for her to transition to college life than it was for other students, since she was not leaving a family behind at home. Two weeks into the school year, she realized she had been wrong. Teachers at Whitfield who had been supportive while she was there dropped out of touch. Her last set of foster parents had had a baby and she felt less a part of their lives. Seeing other students consult their parents for minor decisions made her feel left out; she avoided telling people she had been in foster care before college. Fierceton considered dropping out, but "if I truly can't do this, where am I supposed to return to?"

When Fierceton returned to the St. Louis area on vacations and breaks, she stayed with friends. She began to realize  that she had no sense of identity. Although she had not attended an orientation session for first-generation/low-income (FGLI) students she had been invited to, on campus she began attending meetings and gatherings of Penn First, an FGLI student group founded the preceding year to pressure Penn to better accommodate their needs, such as not closing dormitories and cafeterias over breaks since many FGLI students could not, for various reasons, return home during those periods. Fierceton called the group, "one of the first spaces on campus where I felt, These are my people ... I had never heard of FGLI, but these labels resonated with a story I was still trying to process."

Fierceton was one of 15 freshmen made Civic Scholars, a program focused on social justice and community service, with an emphasis on confronting the intersections of identity and privilege. Professor Walter Licht, a Penn historian who runs the program, recalls her as the sort of student who would "[ask] a question that makes everyone stop and brings the conversation to a different pitch." Another program official that year recalls Fierceton as seeming more vulnerable than she let on; after picking her up from the hospital following bone surgery that year, she noticed that Fierceton had a very light winter coat and few other possessions. She was also working two jobs, as a policy fellow with Philadelphia City Council and another interning in social work at Children's Hospital of Philadelphia.

In her sophomore year, Fierceton, already majoring in political science, decided to pursue social work as a career, with the goal of being a voice for children in foster care like the ones she had come to know. She applied to a program at Penn's School of Social Policy and Practice (commonly referred to at Penn as SP2) that would allow her to begin graduate studies while still an undergraduate, so she could graduate with a master's degree in the field a year after completing her undergraduate degree. The program's application asked "Are you the first generation in your family to attend college?"

Fierceton answered yes. While that was not literally true, Penn's own definition of an FGLI student included those who have a "strained or limited" relationship with a parent who has graduated from college. This is derived from language in the federal Higher Education Act, which ties first-generation status to the educational attainment of the parent the student "regularly resides with and receives support from". Fierceton felt no ambivalence about her answer. "Fuck that—I don't have [a family]" she said later. "I had so much anger and grief, and I didn't want them to be affiliated in any way with this new life I was building."

That feeling was not mutual, Fierceton came to suspect. At her request Penn kept her contact information out of the school's directory on its website. But she says she occasionally received packages at her dorm room containing objects she suspected had come from her mother, such as a bracelet with an inscription about finding the truth, or others close to her, such as a pair of sneakers, which she believed Lovelace, who had sometimes helped her stretch before workouts, had sent. The New Yorker reported that Fierceton reported this to Penn's campus police, fearing that her mother had somehow found out where she was living.

The packages she says she received were supplemented by hangup calls, which a faculty member Fierceton occasionally lived with recalled her receiving in the months preceding the trial of her mother's lawsuit against DSS later in her junior year. After the trial ended with Morrison prevailing and the agency ordered to remove her name from the child-abuse registry, Fierceton resolved to change her last name. She chose Fierceton from a list of names she had come up with herself that projected strength, and a petition to the Court of Common Pleas in Philadelphia was accepted. Later in the year she wrote online that the name change gave her "ownership of her identity" and a sense of agency she had not had before in her life.

In January 2020 Fierceton had a seizure and collapsed during a class for one of her graduate social work courses. She lost consciousness and was taken to the hospital, where she spent three days in intensive care. Doctors diagnosed her with epilepsy, telling her the head injuries that had resulted in her earlier hospitalizations may have been a contributing factor to her developing it.

Two months later the COVID-19 pandemic emerged. Penn shut down in-person classes and gave students living on campus a week to find somewhere else to live until it was safe to return. Fierceton was living off-campus by then, but she and her roommates decided to leave their apartment. At first she went to a friend's home in Ohio and then returned to the Philadelphia area as May and graduation approached to live with a classmate's family. After her graduation summa cum laude, political science professor Anne Norton invited Fierceton to stay with her and her partner in their large house in Northwest Philadelphia for as long as she needed to in order to complete her master's over the next year. "You can't couch-surf in a pandemic", Norton said.

Over the middle of 2020, Fierceton became active in the Black Lives Matter protests at Penn. She helped SP2 assistant professor Toorjo Ghose draft and promote a petition in support of Police Free Penn, an activist group calling on the university to cut its ties with the Philadelphia Police Department over its poor relations with the largely black and Latin residents of the West Philadelphia neighborhoods around the university's campus, and rethink its own police department, the largest private one in the state. "I think that we could contribute to the community, the broader Philadelphia community, and the West Philadelphia community more positively, instead of doing things that are not only undermining them but are actively policing them, and end up creating and perpetuating more violence," she told The Daily Pennsylvanian, the university's student newspaper.

Rhodes Scholarship controversy

Fierceton, who outside of school had also taken on a volunteer position as a birthing doula, decided during that summer to apply for a Rhodes Scholarship to get a Ph.D. at Oxford University in England, encouraged by a classmate who had just won one himself and was impressed by her activism. She expressed some concern to Penn staff that if she won, the media attention might incite her mother and her family to attack her reputation, and expressed on a form she filed with Penn as part of the process a concern of hers that FGLI students such as herself were "pressured to be someone they were not amidst their application process." Ultimately she decided to apply for the scholarship, in which she proposed to expand on the subject of her undergraduate thesis, the intertwining of the foster care and juvenile justice systems, to "continue to try to move forward in my life."

On her application, Fierceton recounted her background and the unexpected way it led to her becoming a foster child. Her account was not completely inaccurate—she described as a foster child one sibling of hers who was actually the biological child of her foster parents, for instance, which she attributed later to not having developed her essay at length. Beth Winkelstein, at the time Penn's deputy provost, signed off on her application for the school, writing that "Mackenzie understands what it is like to be an at-risk youth, and she is determined to re-make the systems that block rather than facilitate success."

Near the end of November Fierceton was named one of 32 Rhodes scholars from the U.S. for the year. In a news release, Penn's then-president Amy Gutmann, a daughter of Jewish refugees from Nazi Germany who had herself been the first in her family to attend college, spoke admiringly of Fierceton as "a first-generation low-income student and a former foster youth." Gutmann, soon to step down from her position to serve as U.S. ambassador to Germany, had made increasing the amount of FGLI students at Penn a priority in her previous 17 years as the university's president.

Wendy Ruderman, a reporter for The Philadelphia Inquirer, called Fierceton to interview her for a story about the scholarship. In a 25-minute conversation, she went into detail with Fierceton about her past and what she planned to do with her scholarship. Ruderman's story, published the next day, began:

Fierceton said later that she had never used the word "poor" to describe herself or her childhood. Ruderman corroborated that later to The New Yorker, saying she was paraphrasing Fierceton's self-identification as FGLI. Fierceton wished that she had been more willing to correct mistaken impressions that she might have made and at the time "just kind of crumbled behind the pressure."

The evening the story ran, Ruderman called Fierceton back and told her she had received some anonymously written emails casting doubt on what she had written. Fierceton clarified the details in question and Ruderman said she understood better. Within days, the father of one of Fierceton's Whitfield friends, and a high-school classmate using an anonymous email, contacted Penn to inform them she had apparently misrepresented herself and had actually spent most of her childhood in her mother's home in an affluent West County suburb of St. Louis. The father's message was forwarded to Penn's general counsel, Wendy White, who got in touch with Morrison.

To White, Morrison repeated her story that her daughter had fabricated the abuse allegations. She added the additional detail that at the time of her first hospitalization, Fierceton had just failed her first AP Chemistry test. "She was falling apart under the academic stresses at school and was exhausted, and I believe looking for an out." Morrison told White in an email. Fierceton says she had not failed any tests; her Whitfield transcript shows she got a B+ in the class.

A week later, Fierceton received an email asking her to attend a meeting over Zoom with Winkelstein. Fierceton had also brought her mentor, a staff member at the university's Civic House, into the meeting; at the outset Winkelstein told the woman she could not speak or she would be disconnected immediately. Winkelstein, who has a Ph.D. in bioengineering and has studied injuries, then proceeded to interrogate Fierceton at length about her abuse and hospitalization, in a manner that led Fierceton to believe that not only did Winkelstein doubt her story but had spoken with Morrison.  Fierceton and her mentor reconstructed the conversation and transcribed it; the university has claimed it is inaccurate but the mentor stands by it.

By the end of the interview Fierceton was crying. Her mentor told Licht afterwards that "it felt like an attack on a student" and that she had never experienced anything like it. Fierceton wrote to SP2 dean Sara Bachman complaining about the interview, saying she felt "worthlessness, hopelessness, and shame" for a week afterwards.

After the interview White emailed Morrison about how it went; she wrote back regretting that Fierceton continued to tell the same story. "She has become emboldened over time, and has been successful with her evolving tale for 6 yrs.", Morrison said. "We would never have believed any of it if we weren't living it." Her sister also wrote White as well, alleging that Fierceton "deliberately tried to frame Carrie and planted 'evidence' around the house, including her own blood."

In December, an anonymous 22-page letter was sent to the U.S. office of the Rhodes Trust, which administers the scholarship program. It, too, alleged that Fierceton was misrepresenting herself as having been poor and grown up entirely in foster care, with many photos of Fierceton as a little girl on the beach and riding horses, and other activities usually associated with affluence. Fierceton believes it was likely sent by Morrison or one of her close relatives. "[I]t was probably from someone in my biological family," she told The Intercept, "because it had photos of me; it had very specific information that very few people would have—and I don't think many people would have random childhood photos of me."

Winkelstein followed up with a letter to Elizabeth Kiss, the trust's CEO, alerting her that the university had been investigating Fierceton's story, found it to have seriously diverged from the reality of her life, with the abuse allegations quite possibly fabricated. "We have concluded that there is a basis for serious concern and that further investigation by the Rhodes Committee may be appropriate", she wrote. Attached were copies of the Missouri court orders expunging Morrison's arrest and removing her name from the DSS registry.

The trust notified Fierceton at the beginning of 2021 that it was conducting an investigation into the allegations. "I really don't have words,'" she told a mentor at the Penn Women's Center. "It is seven years later, and I am still having to prove and prove and prove what has happened to me." She retained two lawyers to represent her pro bono; they talked to Morrison themselves, who told them she still loved her daughter and wanted her to come home. One, Michael Raffaele, said he believed Morrison was trying to leave Fierceton with no other options.

Fierceton supplied the trust's investigators with her medical and court records from the mid-2010s as well as letters from 26 people—teachers at Whitfield, the three Penn faculty members who had written her Rhodes recommendation letters, vouching for her abuse claims and saying she had never misrepresented herself. In April, the trust's investigative committee produced a 15-page report praising Fierceton as "gifted, driven, and charismatic" but concluding ultimately that she "created and repeatedly shared false narratives about herself", noting in particular her references to injuries she was treated for in her September 2014 hospital stay that are not reflected in her medical records. It recommended the scholarship be rescinded.

Before that happened, Fierceton withdrew from the scholarship on her own. Her admission to Oxford was unaffected, and she began her graduate studies in sociology there later in the year, with a Penn professor covering her tuition. She had wanted to appeal the Rhodes committee's findings, but Rafaelle advised her that Penn had hinted to him that it might consider referring the matter to federal prosecutors on the grounds that she had lied about being FGLI on her Free Application for Federal Student Aid form. While her yes answer to "At any time since you turned age 13, were both your parents deceased, were you in foster care or were you a dependent or ward of the court?" was truthful, Rafaelle feared that Penn might share its information with the government and if the U.S. Attorney decided to pursue a prosecution, it would be likely to last a long time and consume much of her attention.

Penn investigation

Shortly after the Rhodes investigation began, Rafaelle was informed that Penn was proposing to revoke Fierceton's bachelors on the grounds of her apparent self-misrepresentation. They would not do so, however, if she agreed to withdraw from the scholarship, surrender the Latin honors that had accompanied her degree, and take a mandatory leave for "counseling and support" before receiving her master's. White, who had apparently drafted the offer, added a sentence to it requiring Fierceton to say she was agreeing to it "voluntarily and without pressure" after she learned that Fierceton was complaining to professors that she felt Penn was pressuring her to do this.

Fierceton refused, and a week before she withdrew from the Rhodes Scholarship, Penn's Office of Student Conduct (OSC) notified Fierceton it, too, would be investigating. At Norton's request, a fellow political science colleague, Rogers Smith, who while at Yale had chaired that university's undergraduate disciplinary committee, agreed to represent Fierceton during what he called "a very unusual process". Penn again spoke with Morrison and, this time as well, the St. Louis County prosecutor who had decided to drop the charges, without informing Fierceton, which the university defended as standard practice not to identify witnesses interviewed.

In July the OSC concluded its investigation with a 31-page report sent to provost Wendell Pritchett examining Fierceton's background more extensively than the Rhodes Trust had. "Mackenzie may have centered certain aspects of her background to the exclusion of others—for reasons we are certain she feels are valid—in a way that creates a misimpression," the report said. It called attention to claims, such as the one in her application essay, that by the time she was six she "knew every police officer in my county by their first name", a claim Fierceton herself admitted was untrue and born of her fear of her biological family when she wrote it.

While the trust had come to seriously doubt Fierceton's claims about the severity of her injuries, OSC declined to make a determination on that. Both reports refrained from expressing an opinion about the truth of her abuse allegations. But while OSC allowed that it may not have been Fierceton's explicit intent to deceive, she had still done so, particularly when checking "yes" on the question on her SP2 application as to whether she was the first in her family to attend college (Fierceton stands by her reliance on Penn's definitions of FGLI on the Penn Plus website and the applicable federal laws; the university says that question is "composed of ordinary words with everyday meanings, and it makes no reference to any term or definition appearing in any other publication.")

The OSC report also concluded that nothing in her academic record warranted the revocation of either degree. It  recommended that Fierceton's master's be withheld until she paid a $4,000 fine and that her academic transcript carry a notation that she was sanctioned for her "objective inaccuracy" in answering the first-generation question on her application. OSC referred the recommendation to an SP2 panel to make a final determination; she has subsequently appealed the decision.

The fine was later withdrawn after it was found to conflict with a provision of the university's charter prohibiting the imposition of fines in cases involving academic integrity. In May 2022, after a lengthy article in The New Yorker drew widespread media attention to Fierceton's story, the university dropped the charge and awarded her the degree. The notation in her transcript remains.

Role in wrongful death suit against university

Fierceton and her faculty supporters have suspected that Penn's investigation of her, and its determination to cast aspersions on her credibility, may be related to her role in fomenting a wrongful death suit filed against the university in August 2020, before she had been announced as a Rhodes Scholarship winner.

After she had recovered from her seizure incident earlier that year, fellow students told her how difficult it had been for first responders to get to the basement of Caster Hall, where SP2 is based and holds most of its classes, and how difficult it had been to get her out. The university's police did not know at first where the building was and the city's paramedics did not know how to get to it. When they did, they were unable to get stretchers or backboards down Caster's stairways or elevators as there was insufficient space. It took nearly an hour, during which Fierceton seized intermittently and never completely regained consciousness, for her to be taken to the hospital.

Classmates who told Fierceton this also noted the similarities to another medical emergency in September 2018, when a 38-year-old SP2 graduate named Cameron Driver had suffered a cardiac event during a class in Caster's basement. As in her case, first responders had experienced similar delays in finding and reaching the building, and difficulties removing Driver once they did due to the same accessibility issues. The situation was further complicated by a lack of cell phone service in the basement, requiring students to team up and verbally relay information from the 9-1-1 operator to a professor performing CPR on Driver and back to a student posted just outside the door. As in Fierceton's case, it took an hour to remove Driver from the building. He died of his heart attack within 12 minutes of arrival at the hospital.

After learning this, Fierceton and a fellow SP2 student began doing research. They took photographs of Caster's staircases and elevators, and interviewed witnesses and some of the Penn paramedics who had responded. They learned that SP2 had no real protocol for an emergency situation in the building. After gathering all the evidence, they approached Driver's widow, Roxanne Logan, who had not been informed of the accessibility issues and delays involved in her husband's death; in fact she had been given the impression he had been evacuated from the building almost as soon as he began experiencing symptoms.

Fierceton shared the information she had with Logan, who in turn took it to a law firm that investigated further. Logan filed her wrongful death suit in August 2020, alleging Penn was negligently responsible for her husband's death through failing to make Caster properly accessible and not making SP2 develop an emergency response protocol. Fierceton was mentioned in the complaint as having experienced similar issues following her seizure; she was deposed in the suit in March 2021, the month before the university's investigation led her to withdraw from the Rhodes Scholarship.

Lawsuit against university

In December 2021 Fierceton retained another lawyer pro bono and filed her own suit against Penn, alleging that the university's investigations into her history and how she had represented herself was a "sham", undertaken with the intent of forcing her to withdraw from the Rhodes Scholarship and damaging her credibility as a witness in the Driver suit, constituting tortious interference with a business relationship and intentional and negligent infliction of emotional distress. Penn, she claimed, had leaked that information to the Inquirer whose editor-in-chief was married to Louisa Shepard, the university's news director, whom she named as a defendant along with Finkelstein, White, and the university's board of trustees. She also alleged that Penn had on many occasions failed to follow its own disciplinary policies in its investigation of her.

Penn filed a 130-page response two weeks later, denying all her allegations of wrongdoing and saying that the university officials and co-defendants who had investigated the case were unaware of the Driver lawsuit when they did. In addition it offered details of what its own investigation had concluded about Fierceton's childhood and adolescence that led OSC to believe it was likely that she had exaggerated or fabricated outright her claims about her mother. It appended both the Rhodes report and OSC's as exhibits.

Fierceton, according to Penn's response, had learned during her parents' divorce how to make calls to the child-abuse hotline and that teachers were mandatory reporters. In addition to the complaint she had made against Lovelace, a similar complaint to police that her mother was abusing prescription drugs also did not yield any evidence to support it. A cousin who lived with the Morrisons for a while did not see any signs of abuse and believed it was possible Fierceton could have inflicted the injuries herself. Penn also noted that her name change had the effect, whether she had intended it or not, of making her background harder to research.

Media coverage

Shortly after Penn filed its response, the Chronicle of Higher Education reported on the story. Its account focused on the Rhodes controversy, discussing her and Driver's suits near the end, and recalling some other recent instances of academic dishonesty, including one 2009 Harvard student whose largely fabricated high school records were only discovered when he had applied for a Rhodes Scholarship. When asked what she might have done differently, Fierceton told the Chronicle that while she had at some points wished she had never applied to Penn, and later considered rephrasing some of the things she wrote on her essays and applications, "[w]here I've landed is that I have a right to write about my experiences as I experienced them. Period." She had not, she insisted, written her original essay with the intent of increasing her chances of admission.

Through her attorney, Morrison gave a statement, her only one so far, on the case: "Mackenzie is deeply loved by her mom and family. Our greatest desire is that Mackenzie chooses to live a happy, healthy, honest, and productive life, using her extraordinary gifts for the highest good." Michael Hayes, who had prosecuted Morrison, told the Chronicle that "The more I learned, the less certain I became about what really happened."

The Chronicle story led to nationwide coverage, most of which framed the narrative as Penn and the Rhodes Trust had in their reports, depicting Fierceton as yet another exposed fraud. The New York Post wrote that "[t]he case ... exposes the murky underbelly of elite schools like Penn." A syndicated morning radio show named Fierceton its "donkey of the day".

Almost three months later, The New Yorker ran a longer article about Fierceton, which had taken the magazine eight months to report and fact-check. It went into greater detail about her past, providing more substantiation for her abuse allegations from teachers, fellow students and their parents, Carrie Brandt (the police detective who had investigated and arrested Morrison) and her allegations that Morrison had enabled Lovelace's sexual abuse. Katie Couric had Fierceton as a guest on her podcast a week later. In mid-April, Penn released Fierceton's master's degree.

The publicity led 150 Penn students to stage a walkout from classes to demonstrate in support of Fierceton. They demanded that the university remove the notation from her file. Gathering outside Caster, whose renovation they also demanded, they marched toward College Hall, where Winkelstein had taken over as interim provost following Gutmann's departure, and chanted for her ouster as well. At the end of the march they were addressed by Fierceton and other FGLI students. "Once you do something that the University sees as undermining its quest for power and prestige, it will not think twice about discarding you, humiliating you, and retaliating against you, which is exactly what they did" said one SP2 student in support of Fierceton.

In a statement to The Daily Pennsylvanian, the university said the New Yorker article "did not accurately reflect" the university's investigation of the issues raised by the Rhodes Trust. Fierceton responded that that showed the university's "vulnerability and desperation". Smith said he believed the university had decided before it began investigating that Fierceton's abuse allegations were false and that she had fabricated them with the goal of finding an easier way into Penn or another elite school.

Poverty porn

In the New Yorker article, Fierceton and others criticized Penn for its use of not only her story but another recent FGLI Rhodes awardee as poverty porn, suggesting the university had turned on her when it learned she had actually come from a privileged, affluent background and thus did not fit the narrative of having grown up in foster care recounted in its news release and the accompanying Inquirer article. Others echoed the criticism.  "Without her trauma, she didn’t matter", wrote a commentator in the Tulane Hullabaloo. "How much does one have to suffer to have value? ... Yes, it may be true that institutions like UPenn give students like Fierceton opportunities because of their story, but that does not mean her narrative is theirs for the taking. Nor is she obligated to meet their expectations of her."

"I cannot avoid the sense that Mackenzie is being faulted for not having suffered enough", Norton told The New Yorker. "She was a foster child, but not for long enough. She is poor, but she has not been poor for long enough. She was abused, but there is not enough blood." Penn, by questioning so much of Fierceton's story, was making itself "complicit in a long campaign of continuing abuse", she added.

Two weeks after the New Yorker article was published, Fierceton gave an interview to The Intercepts Ryan Grim for an installment of the Deconstructed podcast. In addition to reiterating many of the themes of comments made by her and her supporters in the previous articles, including criticism of the Rhodes and Penn investigations (the former of which Grim noted she was putting air quotes around when she mentioned it), she expressed a belief that her story had triggered a defensive anxiety in women like Finkelstein and White:

Jay Caspian Kang sounded similar themes in two different New York Times newsletters discussing Fierceton's story. "Was the problem that a child who was placed into foster care and had no contact with her biological mother wasn't actually a first-generation college student? Or was the real issue that Fierceton did not really fit the profile of a suffering student who needed the benevolence of an Ivy League school?" he asked in the first. In the second, he wrote, "[y]ou could also conclude from Mackenzie Fierceton's story that there is no actual empathy within elite institutions unless you perfectly fit into the trauma hierarchy they have created, which preferences the types of overcoming-adversity stories they can place in a brochure."

Personal life

Fierceton identifies as queer.

See also
DARVO, strategy of accused abusers of in turn accusing their victims.
Linda Tirado, activist whose viral narrative about living in poverty as a single mother was later questioned when her background in an affluent family was revealed

Notes

References

External links

1997 births
Living people
Activists from Missouri
Activists from Pennsylvania
University of Pennsylvania School of Social Policy and Practice alumni
Academic controversies
Child abuse in the United States
Child abuse incidents and cases
People from Danbury, Connecticut
People from Chesterfield, Missouri